The 2004 Asian Women's Handball Championship, the tenth Asian Championship, which was taking place from 23 to 25 July 2004 in Hiroshima, Japan. It acted as the Asian qualifying tournament for the 2005 World Women's Handball Championship.

Standings

Results
All times are local (UTC+9).

Final standing

References
Results

External links
Official Website

Asian
H
Asian Handball Championships
International handball competitions hosted by Japan
July 2004 sports events in Asia